Wyszanów  is a village in the administrative district of Gmina Wieruszów, within Wieruszów County, Łódź Voivodeship, in central Poland.

The village has an approximate population of 700.

History

Wyszanów was a royal village of the Polish Crown, administratively located in the Wieluń County in the Sieradz Voivodeship in the Greater Poland Province of the Polish Crown.

During the German invasion of Poland, which started World War II, in September 1939, the Germans deliberately threw a grenade into a basement where women and children were hiding, thus killing 16 people, including 11 children (see Nazi crimes against the Polish nation).

References

Villages in Wieruszów County